The World Allround Speed Skating Championships for Men took place on 5 and 6 March 1988 in Alma-Ata at the Medeo ice rink.

Title holder was Nikolay Gulyayev from the USSR.

Classification

  * = Fell
  DNS = Did not start

Source:

References

World Allround Speed Skating Championships, 1988
1988 World Allround
Speed skating in the Soviet Union
International sports competitions hosted by the Soviet Union

Attribution
In Dutch